Thrithala is a town and a village in Pattambi taluk in Palakkad District of Kerala state, South India. The town is located along the banks of Bharathapuzha and is famed for its Shiva temple.

History
The legend of 'Parayi petta panthirukulam' is centred on Trithala.  According to this story, a Brahmin named Vararuchi, married a lower caste woman without knowing her true identity(?).  After the marriage, they set out on a long journey.  During the course of the journey, the woman became pregnant several times, and every time she delivered a baby, the husband asked her to leave it there itself.  Each of the babies was taken up by people of different castes (totally 12), thus they grew up in that caste, making the legendary 'Panthirukulam'.  They all became famous in their lives and many tales are attributed to them.  The eldest was Agnihothri, a Brahmin, whose place is Mezhathur in Trithala.  The others are Pakkanar (basket weaver), Perumthachan (Master carpenter), Naranathu Bhranthan (an eccentric but divine person), Vayillakunnilappan (a child without mouth, whom the mother wanted to keep with her) and so on.  Their stories are mentioned in the well known book 'Eithihyamala' by Kottarathil Sankunni.

The Siva temple, probably built during the 9th and 10th century, marks the transition from the Chola to the Pandya style of architecture. According to a legend, the child Agnihotri was bathing in the river along with his mother.  He heaped the sand in the form of a mound on a plate ('thalam' in Malayalam).  When the mother tried to remove the sand, she found that it has solidified in the form of a 'Siva Lingam'.  Thus the deity is known as 'Thalathilappan', meaning God in a plate.  The idol is said to have the constitution of sand. It is believed that the sharp bend in the river in the area was formed due to the river changing its course on its own, to give space for the temple to be built.

Notable residents
 V. T. Bhattathiripad, Dramatist and a prominent freedom fighter
 Maha Kavi Akkitham Achuthan Namboothiri
 Thrithala Kesava Poduval, Thayambaka Maestro
 M. T. Vasudevan Nair, Malayalam Writer & Jnanpit Award Winner
 E. Sreedharan, Former Managing Director of DMRC
 Ammu Swaminathan, Courageous freedom fighter and a prominent leader
 Captain Lakshmi Sahgal, Activist of the Indian independence movement
 Major Ravi, Malayalam film director

Politics
It belongs to Ponnani Loksabha Constituency current MP is E. T. Mohammed Basheer. Thrithala is the 49th legislative assembly constituency, current MLA is  M B Rajesh of CPIM.

Major political parties are the Indian National Congress (INC), the Communist Party of India (Marxist) (CPM), Communist Party of India (CPI), Bharatiya Janata Party (BJP), Social Democratic Party of India (SDPI) and the Indian Union Muslim League (IUML).

Suburbs and Villages
 Mudavannur, Mezhathur
 Njangattiri, Kalyanappadi and Kannannoor
 Ullanoor, V.K.Kadavu and K.R.Narayan Nagar
 Athani, Chittappuram,  Pattithara and Malamakkavu
 othalur
Pattithara
Navayuga Pattithara 
Pooleri
Aloor
Chittapuram

Important Landmarks
 Velliyamkallu park
Pakkanar Colony
Vaidyamadham, Mezhathur
Vemanchery Mana, House of Agnihothri 
Yajneswaram Shiva Temple
Thrithala Juma Masjid
 Kannannoor Bhagavathy Temple 
 V.K.Kadavu Juma Masjidh
 President of India road in honour of T.K. Subramanian who worked in Rashtrapathi Bhawan
 Thrithala Shiva Temple
 Mudavannur Shiva Temple
 Ullanur Juma Masjid
Govt Arts and Science College , Thrithala

References

External links 

 Story about 'Parayi petta panthirukulam'
 Stories about Pakkanar
 Kudallur Village

Villages in Palakkad district

ml:തൃത്താല ഗ്രാമപഞ്ചായത്ത്